The following is a list of Saskatchewan Roughriders all-time records and statistics current to the 2022 CFL season. Each category lists the top five players, where known, except for when the fifth place player is tied in which case all players with the same number are listed.

Grey Cup Championships 

Most by a Player
2 - Darian Durant
2 - John Chick
2 - Mike McCullough
2 - Neal Hughes
2 - Chris Getzlaf

Games 

Most Games
284 – Gene Makowsky
271 – Roger Aldag
246 – Ron Lancaster
238 – Reg Whitehouse
237 – Ron Atchison

Most Regular Seasons Played
17 – Ron Atchison – 1952–1968
17 – Roger Aldag – 1976–1992
17 – Gene Makowsky – 1995–2011
16 – Ron Lancaster – 1963–1978
15 – Fred Wilson – 1911–1926
15 – Bill Clarke – 1951–1965
15 – Reg Whitehouse – 1952–1966

Scoring 

Most Points – Career
2374 – Dave Ridgway
1613 – Paul McCallum
863 – Jack Abendschan
823 – George Reed
757 – Luca Congi

Most Points – Season
233 – Dave Ridgway – 1990
216 – Dave Ridgway – 1989
216 – Dave Ridgway – 1991
215 – Dave Ridgway – 1988
198 – Brett Lauther – 2018

Most Points – Game
30 – Ferd Burkett – versus Winnipeg Blue Bombers, October 26, 1959
28 – Dave Ridgway – versus Ottawa Rough Riders, July 29, 1984
25 – Dave Ridgway – versus Edmonton Eskimos, August 19, 1984
24 – Several tied

Most Touchdowns – Career
137 – George Reed
78 – Ray Elgaard
75 – Don Narcisse
60 – Hugh Campbell
55 – Ken Carpenter
55 – Weston Dressler

Most Touchdowns – Season
18 – Ken Carpenter – 1955
17 – Hugh Campbell – 1966
17 – Craig Ellis – 1985
16 – Jack Hill – 1958
16 – George Reed – 1968
16 – Wes Cates – 2010

Most Touchdowns – Game
5 – Ferd Burkett – versus Winnipeg Blue Bombers, October 26, 1959
4 – Brian Timmis – versus Saskatoon Quakers, October 30, 1920
4 – George Reed – versus Edmonton Eskimos, October 30, 1968
4 – Milson Jones – versus Winnipeg Blue Bombers, August 31, 1988

Most Rushing Touchdowns – Career
134 – George Reed
41 – Wes Cates
34 – Kent Austin
32 – Chris Szarka
30 – Milson Jones

Most Rushing Touchdowns – Season
16 – George Reed – 1968
15 – George Reed – 1967
15 – Wes Cates – 2010
14 – Craig Ellis – 1985
13 – George Reed – 1972

Most Rushing Touchdowns – Game
4 – Ferd Burkett – versus Winnipeg Blue Bombers, October 26, 1959
4 – George Reed – versus Edmonton Eskimos, October 30, 1968
4 – Milson Jones – versus Winnipeg Blue Bombers, August 31, 1988

Most Touchdown Receptions – Career
78 – Ray Elgaard
75 – Don Narcisse
60 – Hugh Campbell
53 – Jeff Fairholm
50 – Weston Dressler

Most Touchdown Receptions – Season
17 – Hugh Campbell – 1966
14 – Jack Hill – 1958
14 – Joey Walters – 1981
13 – Jeff Fairholm – 1991
13 – Weston Dressler – 2012

Most Touchdown Receptions – Game
3 – several tied, most recently Weston Dressler – versus Hamilton Tiger-Cats, June 29, 2012

Passing 

Most Passing Yards – Career
46,710 – Ron Lancaster
28,507 – Darian Durant
26,626 – Kent Austin
14,387 – Frank Tripucka
11,852 – Tom Burgess

Most Passing Yards – Season
6225 – Kent Austin – 1992
5754 – Kent Austin – 1993
5542 – Darian Durant – 2010
4647 – Henry Burris – 2000
4604 – Kent Austin – 1990

Most Passing Yards – Game
559 – Kent Austin – versus BC Lions, August 13, 1992 (OT)
546 – Kent Austin – versus Calgary Stampeders, October 23, 1993
507 – Kent Austin – versus Winnipeg Blue Bombers, Sept 8, 1991 (OT)
507 – Kent Austin – versus Toronto Argonauts, October 31, 1993
500 – Darian Durant – versus Calgary Stampeders, September 17, 2010

Most Pass Attempts – Career
5,834 – Ron Lancaster
3,584 – Darian Durant
3,413 – Kent Austin
1,785 – Frank Tripucka
1,634 – Tom Burgess

Most Pass Attempts – Season
770 – Kent Austin – 1992
644 – Darian Durant – 2010
618 – Kent Austin – 1990
576 – Henry Burris – 2000
561 – Darian Durant – 2009

Most Pass Attempts – Game
65 – Kent Austin – versus Edmonton Eskimos, September 15, 1991
62 – Joe Adams – versus Toronto Argonauts, July 29, 1983
62 – Kent Austin – versus BC Lions, August 13, 1992 (OT)
62 – Darian Durant – versus Montreal Alouettes, August 6, 2010
60 – Kent Austin – versus Edmonton Eskimos, July 15, 1992 (OT)

Most Pass Completions – Career
3,186 – Ron Lancaster
2,226 – Darian Durant
1,964 – Kent Austin
1,634 – Tom Burgess
1,011 – Frank Tripucka

Most Pass Completions – Season
459 – Kent Austin – 1992
405 – Kent Austin – 1993
391 – Darian Durant – 2010
360 – Kent Austin – 1990
339 – Darian Durant – 2009

Most Pass Completions – Game
41 – Kent Austin – versus Toronto Argonauts, October 31, 1993
40 – Kent Austin – versus BC Lions, August 13, 1992 (OT)
39 – Kent Austin – versus Calgary Stampeders, July 8, 1992
38 – Joe Paopao – versus Montreal Alouettes, July 19, 1985

Most Passing Touchdowns – Career
299 – Ron Lancaster
151 – Kent Austin
149 – Darian Durant
83 – Frank Tripucka
74 – Tom Burgess

Most Passing Touchdowns – Season
35 – Kent Austin – 1992
32 – Kent Austin – 1991
31 – Kent Austin – 1993
31 – Darian Durant – 2013
30 – Henry Burris – 2000

Most Passing Touchdowns – Game
6 – Kent Austin – versus BC Lions, September 21, 1991
5 – Several tied

Rushing 

Most Rushing Attempts – Career
3,233 – George Reed
904 – Wes Cates
872 – Mike Saunders
833 – Bobby Marlow
610 – Kenton Keith

Most Rushing Attempts – Season
323 – George Reed – 1975
302 – George Reed – 1967
292 – Robert Mimbs – 1996
288 – George Reed – 1974
287 – Kory Sheets – 2013

Most Rushing Attempts – Game
34 – George Reed – versus Hamilton Tiger-Cats, August 8, 1970
34 – George Reed – versus Winnipeg Blue Bombers, October 12, 1975
33 – George Reed – versus Edmonton Eskimos, September 30, 1973

Most Rushing Yards – Career
16,116 – George Reed
4,761 – Wes Cates
4,396 – Mike Saunders
4,291 – Bobby Marlow
3,811 – Kenton Keith

Most Rushing Yards – Season 
1768 – George Reed – 1965
1598 – Kory Sheets  – 2013
1471 – George Reed – 1967
1454 – George Reed – 1975
1447 – George Reed – 1974
1409 – George Reed – 1966
1403 – Robert Mimbs – 1996
1390 – Ed Buchanan – 1964
1353 – George Reed – 1969
1306 – Mike Strickland – 1978
1285 – Tim McCray – 1989
1277 – Kory Sheets – 2012
1254 – Cookie Gilchrist – 1958
1243 – Darren Davis – 2001
1229 – Wes Cates – 2008
1222 – George Reed – 1968
1205 – Mike Saunders – 1994
1193 – George Reed – 1973
1154 – Kenton Keith – 2004
1146 – George Reed – 1971
1093 – William Powell – 2019
1069 – George Reed – 1972
1054 – Wes Cates – 2010
1037 – Kenton Keith – 2006
1024 – Darren Davis – 2000
1012 – George Reed – 1964

Most Rushing Yards – Game
268 – George Reed – versus BC Lions, October 24, 1965
225 – Curt Schave – versus Saskatoon Hilltops, September 26, 1931
220 – Darren Davis – versus Calgary Stampeders, October 28, 2001
199 – George Reed – versus Hamilton Tiger-Cats, August 8, 1970

Longest Run
98 – Alex Bravo – versus BC Lions, September 29, 1956
93 – Ray Purdin – versus Montreal Alouettes, September 12, 1962
93 – Ed Buchanan – versus Calgary Stampeders, August 3, 1964
90 – Van Valkenberg – versus Calgary Stampeders, August 20, 1976
85 – Ed Buchanan – versus Ottawa Rough Riders, September 10, 1967

Receiving 

Most Receiving Yards – Career
13,189 – Ray Elgaard
12,336 – Don Narcisse
7,792 – Weston Dressler
6,171 – Jeff Fairholm
5,697 – Chris Getzlaf

Most Receiving Yards – Season
1715 – Joey Walters – 1981
1692 – Joey Walters – 1982
1560 – Curtis Marsh – 2000
1494 – Ray Elgaard – 1990
1444 – Ray Elgaard – 1992

Most Receiving Yards – Game
260 – Chris DeFrance – versus Edmonton Eskimos, August 5, 1983
255 – Andy Fantuz – versus Calgary Stampeders, September 17, 2010
244 – Jeff Fairholm – versus Toronto Argonauts, September 26, 1992
240 – Andy Fantuz – versus Hamilton Tiger-Cats, October 14, 2007
231 – Steve Adkins – versus Saskatoon Hilltops, October 4, 1934
231 – Duron Carter – versus Ottawa Redblacks, October 13, 2017

Most Receptions – Career
919 – Don Narcisse
830 – Ray Elgaard
538 – Weston Dressler
384 – Dan Farthing
368 – Chris Getzlaf

Most Receptions – Season
123 – Don Narcisse – 1995
102 – Joey Walters – 1981
102 – Craig Ellis – 1985
102 – Curtis Marsh – 2000
95 – Don Narcisse – 1998

Most Receptions – Game
15 – Don Narcisse – versus Toronto Argonauts, October 31, 1993
14 – Joey Walters – versus Winnipeg Blue Bombers, October 21, 1979
14 – Craig Ellis – versus Montreal Concordes, July 19, 1985
13 – several tied, most recently Weston Dressler – versus Hamilton Tiger-Cats, June 29, 2012

Longest Reception
107 – Jeff Fairholm – versus Winnipeg Blue Bombers, September 2, 1990
106 – Willis Jacox – versus Calgary Stampeders, July 18, 1991
104 – Ray Purdin – versus Hamilton Tiger-Cats, October 15, 1962
102 – Gord Barwell – versus BC Lions, October 24, 1965

Interceptions 

Most Interceptions – Career
51 – Glen Suitor
38 – Ken McEachern
35 – Bruce Bennett
33 – Ted Dushinski
33 – Steve Dennis

Most Interceptions – Season
11 – Terry Irvin – 1984
10 – Dale West – 1963
10 – Ken McEachern – 1980
10 – Ed Gainey – 2017
9 – James Patrick – 2010

Most Interceptions – Game
4 – Ed Gainey – versus BC Lions, August 13, 2017
3 – Several tied, most recently – Macho Harris – versus Montreal Alouettes, September 27, 2015

Quarterback sacks 
 Note: Sacks were first recorded in 1981.

Most Sacks – Career
142 – Bobby Jurasin
89 – Vince Goldsmith
70 – Gary Lewis
53 – George Wells
53 – John Chick

Most Sacks – Season
22 – Bobby Jurasin – 1987
20 – Vince Goldsmith – 1983
18.5 – Vince Goldsmith – 1981
17 – George Wells – 1975

Most Sacks – Game
5 – Neal Smith – at Calgary Stampeders, July 7, 1999

Tackles 
 Note: Tackles were first recorded in 1987, but there was no differentiation between Defensive and Special Teams tackles. Those categorical differences were added in 1991.

Most Defensive Tackles – Season
120 – Darnell Sankey – 2022
118 – Dave Albright – 1987

Most Defensive Tackles – Game
16 – Reggie Hunt – at Winnipeg Blue Bombers, July 10, 2003

Field goals 
Most Field Goals – Career
574 – Dave Ridgway (1982–95)
368 – Paul McCallum (1994–2005, 2015)
167 – Brett Lauther (2018–19, 2021)
166 – Luca Congi (2006–11)
159 – Jack Abendschan (1965–75)

Most Field Goals – Season
59 – Dave Ridgway (1990)
55 – Dave Ridgway (1988)
54 – Terry Baker (1989)
54 – Brett Lauther (2018)
52 – Dave Ridgway (1991)

Most Field Goals – Game
8 – Dave Ridgway – versus Edmonton Eskimos, July 23, 1988
8 – Dave Ridgway – at Ottawa Rough Riders, July 29, 1984
7 – Bob Macoritti – versus Toronto Argonauts, August 27, 1978
7 – Dave Ridgway – versus BC Lions, July 29, 1984
7 – Dave Ridgway – at BC Lions, August 2, 1990
7 – Dave Ridgway – versus Edmonton Eskimos, August 19, 1990
7 – Paul McCallum – versus Edmonton Eskimos, September 28, 1997
7 – Luca Congi – versus Hamilton Tiger-Cats, July 1, 2010

Highest Field Goal Accuracy – Career (minimum 100 attempts)
84.34% (167/198) – Brett Lauther (2018–19, 2021–22)
81.50% (141/173) – Christopher Milo (2011–15)
79.43% (166/209) – Luca Congi (2006–11)
77.99% (574/736) – Dave Ridgway (1982–95)
75.88% (368/485) – Paul McCallum (1994–2005, 2015)

Highest Field Goal Accuracy – Season (minimum 30 attempts)
90.57% (48/53) – Dave Ridgway (1993)
90.00% (54/60) – Brett Lauther (2018)
88.89% (32/36) – Christopher Milo (2015)
88.46% (46/52) – Christopher Milo (2013)
86.36% (38/44) – Luca Congi (2006)
86.36% (38/44) – Luca Congi (2008)

Longest Field Goal
62 yards – Paul McCallum – versus Edmonton Eskimos, October 27, 2001
60 yards – Dave Ridgway – versus Winnipeg Blue Bombers, September 6, 1987
59 yards – Paul Watson – versus Winnipeg Blue Bombers, July 12, 1981
58 yards – Paul McCallum – versus Hamilton Tiger-Cats, October 24, 1999
57 yards – Bob Macoritti – versus Edmonton Eskimos, October 19, 1980
57 yards – Brett Lauther – at Ottawa Redblacks, June 20, 2019
57 yards – Brett Lauther – versus Montreal Alouettes, July 2, 2022

Most Consecutive Field Goals
28 – Dave Ridgway (1993)
28 – Christopher Milo (2013)
21 – Dave Ridgway (1991–92)
21 – Luca Congi (2006)

Singles 
Most Singles – Career
111 – Dave Ridgway (1982–95)
104 – Paul McCallum (1994–2005, 2015)
92 – Fred Wilson (1911–1926)
72 – Jack Abendschan (1965–75)

Most Singles – Season
23 – Fred Wilson – 1913
20 – Glenn Dobbs – 1952
19 – Butch Avinger – 1952
19 – Larry Isbell – 1956
19 – Paul Watson – 1981
19 – Paul McCallum – 2002

Team Statistics

Most Points in a Game by the Roughriders
58 - Ottawa 22 at Saskatchewan 58, August 7, 1989
56 - Winnipeg 4 at Saskatchewan 56, September 3, 1995
56 - Winnipeg 23 at Saskatchewan 56, September 1, 1991
56 - Saskatchewan 56 at Edmonton 8, August 28, 1964
55 - Saskatchewan 55 at Winnipeg 10, September 13, 2009
55 - Edmonton 9 at Saskatchewan 55, October 25, 2008
55 - Winnipeg 11 at Saskatchewan 55, September 2, 1990
54 - Saskatchewan 54 at Edmonton 31, August 25, 2017
54 - Edmonton 14 at Saskatchewan 54, July 28, 2007
54 - Montreal 51 at Saskatchewan 54 (2 OT), July 1, 2010
54 - Saskatchewan 54 at Edmonton 52 (4 OT), October 28, 2000
53 - Calgary 8 at Saskatchewan 53, October 3, 1982
52 - Winnipeg 0 at Saskatchewan 52, September 2, 2012
52 - Calgary 52 at Saskatchewan 52 (4 OT), July 28, 2000
52 - Hamilton 16 at Saskatchewan 52, July 26, 1991
51 - Saskatchewan 51 at Hamilton 8, August 26, 2006
51 - Ottawa 41 at Saskatchewan 51, August 17, 2003
50 - British Columbia 18 at Saskatchewan 50, October 24, 1971

Roughriders' Largest Margins of Victory 
52 - Winnipeg 0 at Saskatchewan 52, September 2, 2012
52 - Winnipeg 4 at Saskatchewan 56, September 3, 1995
48 - Saskatchewan 56 at Edmonton 8, August 28, 1964
47 - Saskatchewan 47 at Winnipeg 0, October 15, 1949
46 - Edmonton 9 at Saskatchewan 55, October, 25 2008
45 - Saskatchewan 55 at Winnipeg 10, September 13, 2009
45 - Calgary 8 at Saskatchewan 53, October 3, 1982
44 - Winnipeg 11 at Saskatchewan 55, September 2, 1990
44 - Montreal 0 at Saskatchewan 44, September 5, 1966
43 - Saskatchewan 51 at Hamilton 8, August 26, 2006
41 - Calgary 8 at Saskatchewan 49, July 8, 2007
40 - Edmonton 14 at Saskatchewan 54, July 28, 2007
40 - Edmonton 0 at Saskatchewan 40, August 15, 1976

Roughriders' Shutouts
52-0 - Winnipeg at Saskatchewan, September 2, 2012
47-0 - Saskatchewan at Winnipeg, October 15, 1949
44-0 - Montreal at Saskatchewan, September 5, 1966
40-0 - Edmonton at Saskatchewan, August 21, 1976
37-0 - Hamilton at Saskatchewan, July 21, 2013
33-0 - Calgary at Saskatchewan, October 27, 1956
32-0 - Montreal at Saskatchewan, September 7, 1964
23-0 - Edmonton at Saskatchewan, August 27, 1951
21-0 - Calgary at Saskatchewan, October 9, 1950
17-0 - Saskatchewan at British Columbia, August 30, 1954

Highest Single Game Home Attendance
55,438 – Calgary 20 at Saskatchewan 25, October 14, 1995
44,910 - Winnipeg 25 at Saskatchewan 48, September 1, 2013
43,613 – Calgary 22 at Saskatchewan 24, October 13, 2003
40,637 – Montreal 21 at Saskatchewan 24, August 17, 2013
40,320 – Winnipeg 36 at Saskatchewan 18, August 31, 2003
39,373 - BC 24 at Saskatchewan 22, September 29, 2013
37,372 – Hamilton 0 at Saskatchewan 37, July 21, 2013
35,579 - Edmonton 9 at Saskatchewan 14, October 12, 2013
35,296 – Calgary 21 at Saskatchewan 36, July 5, 2013

References 
Saskatchewan Roughriders Media Guide
Saskatchewan Roughriders All-Time Leaders
Saskatchewan Roughriders Individual Records
CFL Guide & Record Book, 2017 Edition
Canadian Football League
"Riders by the Numbers", Regina Leader-Post, 4 September 2012, p. D2.

Saskatchewan Roughriders lists
Canadian Football League records and statistics